Marasmius is a genus of mushroom-forming fungi in the family Marasmiaceae.  It contains about 500 species of agarics, of which a few, such as Marasmius oreades, are edible.  However, most members of this genus are small, unimpressive brown mushrooms.  Their humble appearance contributes to their not being readily distinguishable to non-specialists, and they are therefore seldom collected by mushroom hunters.  Several of the species are known to grow in the characteristic fairy ring pattern.

The author of the genus was Elias Magnus Fries, who in 1838 classified white-spored agarics having a tough central stipe in this taxon if they were marcescent, i.e. they could dry out but later revive when moistened. For Fries, marcescence — by contrast with the "putrescent" (decomposing) nature of most mushrooms — was an important character for classification, which he used to separate this group from genus Collybia (which has now been split into many newer genera).  The name Marasmius itself comes from the Greek word marasmos, meaning "drying out".  Modern mycologists no longer consider the marcescence/putrescence distinction a reliable criterion for taxonomy, but Fries's definition of the genus is still roughly applicable.

Species
Below is a list of more prominent species (for a complete list see List of Marasmius species).  Note that some well-known former members of Marasmius, such as M. alliaceus, have been moved into the new genus Mycetinis; a few others have been reclassified as Rhizomarasmius or Gloiocephala.  Former M. androsaceus is now considered to belong to genus Gymnopus.

M. amazonicus
M. anomalus
M. atrocastaneus
M. auklandicus
M. aurantiobasalis
M. bambusinus
M. bellus
M. bulliardii
M. buxi - box parachute
M. caperatus
M. capillaris
M. caricis
M. chordalis
M. cladophyllus
M. cohaerens
M. collinus
M. corbariensis
M. crinis-equi
M. croceus
M. curranii
M. curreyi
M. cylindraceocampanulatus
M. delicatus
M. delectans
M. elegans - velvet parachute
M. epiphylloides
M. epiphyllus - leaf parachute
M. exocarpi
M. exustoides
M. favrei
M. fishii
M. fulvoferrugineus
M. funalis
M. galbinus
M. gelatinosipes
M. graminum
M. haematocephalus
M. hudsonii - holly parachute
M. indopurpureostriatus 
M. insititius
M. kanukaneus
M. koae
M. kroumirensis
M. limosus
M. masonii
M. meridionalis
M. micraster
M. midnapurensis
M. minutus
M. nigripes
M. oreades - fairy ring mushroom
M. otagensis
M. pallenticeps
M. palmivorus
M. perforans
M. perpusillus
M. phalaricola
M. podocarpicola
M. prasiosmus
M. pulcherripes
M. pyrrhocephalus
M. pusillissimus
M. pusio
M. quercophilus
M. resinosus
M. rhombisporus
M. rhopalostylidis
M. rimuphilus
M. rosulatus
M. rotula - collared parachute or pinwheel mushroom
M. sacchari
M. saccharinus
M. sasicola
M. semiustus
M. setosus
M. siccus
M. spaniophyllus
M. splachnoides
M. subsupinus
M. stenophyllus
M. strictipes (edible)
M. sullivantii
M. tageticolor
M. tenuiparietalis
M. tenuissimus
M. tinctorius
M. torquescens
M. unilamellatus
M. wettsteinii
M. wynneae - pearly parachute

See also
 List of Marasmiaceae genera

References

External links

 Genus Marasmius  at Mushroom Expert.com

 
Agaricales genera
Taxa named by Elias Magnus Fries
Bioluminescent fungi